The 1940 Tour of Flanders was held in 1940.

General classification

Final general classification

References
Résultats sur siteducyclisme.net
Résultats sur cyclebase.nl
Résultats sur les-sports.info

External links
 

Tour of Flanders
1940 in road cycling
1940 in Belgian sport
March 1940 events